The Dr. John and Viola Phillips House and Office, at S. 337 Spokane Ave. in Newport, Washington, is a historic house built in 1914.  It includes Bungalow/craftsman architecture.  It was listed on the National Register of Historic Places in 19.

It was deemed significant for association with "pioneer"-era physician Dr. John Phillips and
wife Viola, a registered nurse, who together served Newport from an office portion of this house, and also for its architecture.  It is "a representative example" of a Craftsman-style bungalow.  It was a work of local architect/engineer Harold A. Sewell and is well preserved. Dr. Phillips served Newport for 25 years, 13 in this house.  Earlier he had bought an open-sided Mitchell automobile in 1907, the first car in Newport, which he used to rescue residents and help fire fighters during a major fire, the "Big Smoke", in 1910 (Great Fire of 1910?).

References 

Houses on the National Register of Historic Places in Washington (state)
Houses completed in 1914
Houses in Pend Oreille County, Washington
National Register of Historic Places in Pend Oreille County, Washington
1914 establishments in Washington (state)